Atlantagrotis is a genus of moths of the family Noctuidae.

Selected species
Atlantagrotis aethes (Mabille, 1885)
Atlantagrotis hesperoides (Köhler, 1945)
Atlantagrotis nelida (Köhler, 1945)

References
Natural History Museum Lepidoptera genus database

Noctuinae